The Duel of the Century is a 1981 Hong Kong film adapted from Juezhan Qianhou of Gu Long's Lu Xiaofeng novel series. The film was directed by Chor Yuen, produced by the Shaw Brothers Studio, and starred Tony Liu as the lead character.

Synopsis
The main character tries to discover why two famous people intend to have a duel.

Cast
Tony Liu as Lu Xiaofeng
Elliot Ngok as Ximen Chuixue
Jason Pai as Ye Gucheng
Linda Chu as Ouyang Qing
Ching Li as Leng Qingqiu
Helen Poon as Sun Xiuqing
Sun Chien as Hua Manlou
Lung Tin-sang as Sikong Zhaixing
Cheung Ying as Zhenjia Niren Zhang
Cho Tat-wah as Monk Kugua
Ngai Fei as Gu Qingfeng
Cheng Miu as Li Yanbei
Ku Kuan-chung as Yan Renying
Kwan Fung as Emperor
Yeung Chi-hing as Du Tongxuan
Lam Fai-wong as Xuan'er Zhao
Chan Ka-kei as Tang Tianrong
Chan Kwok-kuen as Monk Shengtong
Kara Hui
Shum Fong
Wong Yung
Yuen Wah
Yuen Bun
Yeung Ching-ching
Tang Ching
Yeung Hung
Siu Yuk
Wong Pei-kei
Tsui Chung-sun
Lam Siu-kwan
Lam Wai

External links

1981 films
Hong Kong martial arts films
Wuxia films
Shaw Brothers Studio films
Works based on Lu Xiaofeng (novel series)
Films directed by Chor Yuen
Films based on works by Gu Long
1980s Hong Kong films